Barangay elections were held in the country's roughly 42,000 barangays for the positions of barangay captain and six councilors on March 28, 1989. Such elections are supposed to be held every three years but have often been postponed. Originally scheduled for November 1988, President Corazon Aquino and the military recommended its postponement for concern that infrastructure projects could be delayed in the provinces.

See also
Commission on Elections
Politics of the Philippines
Philippine elections
President of the Philippines

References

External links
The Philippine Presidency Project
Official website of the Commission on Elections

1989
1989 elections in the Philippines